William Dawson (January 1852 – 27 July 1923) was a 19th-century Liberal Party Member of Parliament in Dunedin, Otago, New Zealand.

Early life
Dawson was born in Aberdeen, Scotland, in January 1852. He followed his father into the profession as a brewer.

Political career

He was first elected to Dunedin City Council in 1885. Two years later, he was elected Mayor of Dunedin for one term. In 1892, he was again elected onto the city council.

References

1852 births
1923 deaths
Members of the New Zealand House of Representatives
Mayors of Dunedin
New Zealand Liberal Party MPs
New Zealand MPs for Dunedin electorates
19th-century New Zealand politicians